Deh Kalan (also Romanized as Deh Kalān; also known as Dīv Kalān) is a village in Lafur Rural District, North Savadkuh County, Mazandaran Province, Iran. At the 2006 census, its population was 210, in 74 families.

References 

Populated places in Savadkuh County